Onychocerus is a Neotropical genus of beetles in the family Cerambycidae, containing the following species:

 Onychocerus aculeicornis (Kirby, 1818)
 Onychocerus albitarsis Pascoe, 1859
 Onychocerus ampliatus Bates, 1875
 Onychocerus concentricus Bates, 1862
 Onychocerus giesberti Júlio & Monné, 2001
 Onychocerus hovorei Júlio & Monné, 2001
 Onychocerus scorpio (Fabricius, 1781)
 Onychocerus versutus (Lane, 1966)

References

Anisocerini